Cryptotrema seftoni, the Hidden blenny, is a species of labrisomid blenny known only from Angel de la Guarda Island, in the Gulf of California  This species is a deep water species known to occur on rocky reefs at depths greater than .  No specimens of this fish have been collected since 1952 and it is poorly known. The specific name honours Joseph W. Sefton, Jr. (1882–1966), a banker from San Diego, California, from whose yacht the type was dredged.

References

seftoni
Fish of the Gulf of California
Fish described in 1954
Taxa named by Clark Hubbs
Taxobox binomials not recognized by IUCN